Klaus Uuno Suomela (November 10, 1888 – April 4, 1962) was a prolific Finnish writer. One of his most successful works was the film script on which the popular 1942 film Hopeakihlajaiset ("Silver Engagement") was based. Suomela later worked his script into a novel.

He competed as a gymnast in the 1912 Summer Olympics as part of the Finnish team, which won the silver medal in the gymnastics men's team, free system event. His work was also part of the literature event in the art competition at the 1924 Summer Olympics with a 4-act drama, Milo, Olympian sankari ("Milo, Olympic hero").

References

Further reading
 Kulha, Keijo K.: Suomela, Klaus Uuno (1888–1962). Kansallisbiografia-verkkojulkaisu (maksullinen)]. 23.3.2007. Helsinki: Suomalaisen Kirjallisuuden Seura
"Klaus U. Suomela", Aleksis Kivestä Martti Merenmaahan, pp. 693–698. Porvoo: WSOY, 19ag
Virtamo, Keijo (ed.): Fokus-Urheilu 2, p. 20. Otava, 1970
Veljenpoika: Aikamme lapsipuoli (Urho Kekkosen pakina Klaus Suomelasta). "Uusi Kuvalehti" 1954.

External links
Hopeakihlajaiset (1942)

1888 births
1962 deaths
Finnish writers
Finnish male artistic gymnasts
Gymnasts at the 1912 Summer Olympics
Olympic gymnasts of Finland
Olympic silver medalists for Finland
Olympic medalists in gymnastics
Medalists at the 1912 Summer Olympics
Olympic competitors in art competitions
20th-century Finnish people